The Dallara F190 was a Formula One car designed by Gian Paolo Dallara and Christian Vanderpleyn for use by the BMS Scuderia Italia team during the 1990 Formula One season. It was powered by the 3.5L Cosworth DFR engine. It failed to score any points for the team.

Race history
Driven by Italians Andrea de Cesaris and Emanuele Pirro (Gianni Morbidelli drove in the first two races of the season when Pirro had been diagnosed with hepatitis), the car debuted at the 1990 United States Grand Prix, where de Cesaris qualified third on the grid. He was running in fifth place when he retired with engine problems.

BMS Scuderia Italia failed to earn any points with the F190 during the season. Reliability was poor and the team's drivers were only able to reach the finish in seven of the season's sixteen Grands Prix, although one of these finishes (de Cesaris in France) was later disqualified. The best results for the F190 were a pair of 10th places, one for Pirro in Hungary and the other by de Cesaris in Italy.

Complete Formula One results
(key)

References 

1990 Formula One season cars
Dallara Formula One cars